Tårnborg (or Taarnborg), from 1671 until 1841 known as Dyrehavegaard, is a former manor house in Korsør, Slagelse Municipality, Denmark. The buildings are now part of Hotel Comwell Grand Park.  The Neoclassical main building from 1803 and the manager's house from 1843 were listed on the Danish registry of protected buildings and places in 1982.

History

Origins
Tårnborg was originally the name of a small fortified town whose fortifications were most likely constructed by Svend Grathe in the middle of the 12th century. After Svend Grathe's death, Tårnborg Castle was part of Valdemar I's crown land but lost its military importance when  Korsør Castle was built. Tårnborg Castle's home farm was from then on known as Korsør Castle's home farm. In 1458, Christian I allowed the farmers in the new town of Korsør to use the land for grazing in return for the payment of an annual fee. Korsør Castle's home farm was destroyed during the Second Northern War (1657–1660)

Dyrehovedgaard, 16711841
In 1662, Hugo Lützow proposed to give the land to citizens of Slagelse who were willing to move to Korsør. The proposal was approved but never realized, and in 1669  the land was instead divided between Hugo Lützow (32 ) and councilman Hans Jørgensen (25 ). Hans Jørgensen renamed the estate  after in 1671 acquiring Hugo Lützow's share of the land.

Hans Jørgensen served as mayor of Korsør and was the wealthiest man in the town at the time of his death in 1684. Dyrehovedgård changed hands several times over the next decades. In 1709, it was acquired by Ulrich Mogensen. He had previously leased Brahetrolleborg. The land was supposed to be returned to the Crown in 1719 for inclusion in Antvorskov Cavalry District, but after a personal meeting with Frederick IV, Ulrich Mogensen was allowed to keep the estate. At the time of his death, its size had grown to 204 .

In 1741, Mogensen's widow sold Dyrehovedgård to Poul Hein. He continued the work with expanding the estate through the acquisition of more land. In 1749, it had finally reached the size of a "complete manor", or seat, meaning that it comprised copyholds with a total area of more than 200 , a status that was rewarded with tax exemptions and other privileges.

In 1766, Dyrehovedgård was acquired by Christian Eggers. In 1774 he purchased one of the nine estates that was sold in public auction when Antvorskov Cavalry District was dissolved. The estate was called Tårnborg after the old fortification but Eggers instantly renamed it Tårnholm. On Eggers' death in 1791, Dyrehavegaard and Tårnholm  both passed to his son Niels Christian Eggers. He Kept Durehavegaard while Tårnholm was sold after just one year in his ownership.

Niels Christian Eggers was like many other estate owners hit by the economic downturn that followed the state bankruptcy of 1813. In 1821, Dyrehovedgård was taken over by the Crown when he was unable to pay his taxes. In  1823, Dyrehovedgård and copyholds with a total area of 84  were sold to Christian Ernst Frederik Theill while the remainder of the copyholds was sold to Frederik Adolf Holstein-Holsteinborg. Theill's widow Anna Cathrine Hansen kept the estate when he died the following year. In 1834, she ceded it to their son Andreas Richard Theil.

In  1838, Andreas Richard Theil sold Dyrehovedgård to Ferdinand Ree from Hamburg.

Tårnholm, 1841present
In 1841, Dyrehovedgård changed hands again when the estate was acquired by Valdemar Tully Oxholm. He had close ties to Christian IX by whom he was appointed to the Danish Constituent Assembly and he was a member of Landstinget from 1849 to 1853. In 1846, Oxholm renamed his estate Tårnborg.  He increased the size of the estate through land reclamation along the coastline and convinced the railway commission that the new Korsør Station should be located on his estate.

In 1866, Oxholm sold Tårnborg to Jørgen Albert Bech. Bech was the brother of August Willads Bech, the owner of nearby Valbygård. After Jørgen Albert Bech's death, Tårnborg was passed down to his eldest son Edvard Bech. Most of the farm buildings were destroyed by fire in 1904. This prompted Edvard Bech to sell the estate to the town council. Tårnborg was later sold several times before once again being acquired by the Korsør Town Council in 1948.

Today
Taarnborg is today owned by I/S Tårnborg Parkhotel and forms part of Hotel Comwell Grand Park. The Neoclassical main building from 1803 and the manager's house from 1843 were listed on the Danish registry of protected buildings and places in 1982.

List of owners
 ( –1669) The Crown
 (1669–1671) Hugo Lützow
 (1671–1684) Hans Jørgensen
 (1684– ) Jokum Brorsen
 ( –1699) Eiler Jacobsen Eilert
 (1699– ) Christian Schnitler
 ( –1709) Anders Trolle
 (1709– ) Ulrich Mogensen
 ( –1741) Karen Mogensen
 (1741–1766) Poul Hein
 (1766–1793) Christian Eggers
 (1793–1821) Niels Christian Eggers
 (1821–1823) The Crown
 (1823–1824) Christian Ernst Frederik Theill
 (1824–1834) Anna Cathrine Theill, née Hansen
 (1834–1838) Andreas Richard Theill
 (1838–1841) Ferdinand Ree
 (1841–1866) Valdemar Tully Oxholm
 (1866–1876) Jørgen Albert Bech
 (1876–1901) Edvard Bech
 (1901–1904) Korsør Kommune
 (1904–1922) Peter Johansen Flach de Neergaard
 (1922–1935) P. Madelung
 (1922–1935) C.A. Madelung
 (1935–1948) N.V. Jørgensen
 (1948– ) Korsør Kommune
 (2002– ) I/S Tårnborg Parkhotel

References

Rxternal links
 Source

Manor houses in Slagelse Municipality
Listed buildings and structures in Slagelse Municipality
Listed castles and manor houses in Denmark
Houses completed in 1803
Land reclamation in Denmark